Cheektowaga Central High School is a high school in Cheektowaga, New York located at 3600 Union Road and serves grades 9 through 12. The current principal is Karin Cyganovich and the current assistant principal is Mr. Michael Fatta. It is part of the Cheektowaga Central School District.

History 
The first secondary school in Cheektowaga was Pine Hill High School, erected in 1921 at 1635 East Delavan Avenue. This school operated for forty years before the current Cheektowaga Central High School was constructed and opened in 1960. The high school housed grades 7-12 before the opening of Central Middle School in 1989 in an adjacent wing of the high school.

References

External links  
Official Website

Education in Buffalo, New York
High schools in Erie County, New York
Public high schools in New York (state)